Lokroi is a municipality in the Phthiotis regional unit, Central Greece, Greece. The seat of the municipality is the town Atalanti. The municipal unit has an area of 614.761 km2.

Municipality
The municipality Lokroi was formed at the 2011 local government reform by the merger of the following 4 former municipalities, that became municipal units:
Atalanti
Dafnousia
Malesina
Opountioi

References

Municipalities of Central Greece
Locris
Populated places in Phthiotis